The 2014 Calder Cup playoffs of the American Hockey League began on April 23, 2014, with the same playoff format that was introduced in 2012. The sixteen teams that qualified, eight from each conference, will play best-of-five series in the conference quarterfinals, with the playoffs to continue with best-of-seven series for the conference semi-finals, conference finals, and Calder Cup finals. The Texas Stars defeated the St. John's IceCaps in five games to win the Calder Cup for the first time in Texas Stars' franchise history.

Playoff seeds
After the 2013–14 AHL regular season, 16 teams qualified for the playoffs. The top eight teams from each conference qualifies for the playoffs.

Eastern Conference

Atlantic Division
 Manchester Monarchs – 105 points
 St. John's IceCaps – 99 points
 Providence Bruins – 91 points

Northeast Division
 Springfield Falcons – 100 points
 Albany Devils – 93 Points

East Division
 Binghamton Senators – 96 points
 Wilkes-Barre/Scranton Penguins – 92 points
 Norfolk Admirals – 90 points

Western Conference

West Division
 Texas Stars – 106 points
 Abbotsford Heat – 94 points
 Oklahoma City Barons – 83 points

Midwest Division
 Chicago Wolves – 100 points
 Grand Rapids Griffins – 99 points
 Milwaukee Admirals – 91 points

North Division
 Toronto Marlies – 96 points
 Rochester Americans – 85 points

Bracket

Conference quarterfinals 
Note 1: All times are in Eastern Time (UTC-4).
Note 2: Game times in italics signify games to be played only if necessary.
Note 3: Home team is listed first.

Eastern Conference

(1) Manchester Monarchs vs. (8) Norfolk Admirals

(2) Springfield Falcons vs. (7) Providence Bruins

(3) Binghamton Senators vs. (6) Wilkes-Barre/Scranton Penguins

(4) St. John's IceCaps vs. (5) Albany Devils

Western Conference

(1) Texas Stars vs. (8) Oklahoma City Barons

(2) Chicago Wolves vs. (7) Rochester Americans

(3) Toronto Marlies vs. (6) Milwaukee Admirals

(4) Grand Rapids Griffins vs. (5) Abbotsford Heat

Conference semifinals

Eastern Conference

(4) St. John's IceCaps vs. (8) Norfolk Admirals

(6) Wilkes-Barre/Scranton Penguins vs. (7) Providence Bruins

Western Conference

(1) Texas Stars vs. (4) Grand Rapids Griffins

(2) Chicago Wolves vs. (3) Toronto Marlies

Conference finals

Eastern Conference

(4) St. John's IceCaps vs. (6) Wilkes-Barre/Scranton Penguins

Western Conference

(1) Texas Stars vs. (3) Toronto Marlies

Calder Cup Finals

Texas Stars vs. St. John's IceCaps

Playoff statistical leaders

Leading skaters

These are the top ten skaters based on points. If there is a tie in points, goals take precedence over assists.

GP = Games played; G = Goals; A = Assists; Pts = Points; +/– = Plus-minus; PIM = Penalty minutes

Leading goaltenders 

This is a combined table of the top five goaltenders based on goals against average and the top five goaltenders based on save percentage with at least 60 minutes played. The table is initially sorted by goals against average, with the criterion for inclusion in bold.

GP = Games played; W = Wins; L = Losses; SA = Shots against; GA = Goals against; GAA = Goals against average; SV% = Save percentage; SO = Shutouts; TOI = Time on ice (in minutes)

References

Calder Cup playoffs
Calder Cup Playoffs